Kitsune Bakuchi is a dice game from Japan in which a player tries to roll three dice with the same number on them.  If the player succeeds, he or she wins four times the amount wagered.  The term literally means "fox gambling."

There are six winning throws out of 216 total possible throws, so the winning probability is 6/216 = 1/36. Thus fair Kitsune Bakuchi (zero house edge) gives out winnings of 36 times the winning player's bet.

Sources
 Notes, page 167.  Kokichi, Katsu.  Musui's Story: The Autobiography of a Tokugawa Samurai.  Translated: Craig, Teruko.  Arizona press: 1988.

Dice games
Japanese games